Miriam Auhea Kekāuluohi Crowningburg Kamai (c. 1839–1899) was a Hawaiian high chiefess (aliʻi) during the Hawaiian Kingdom. She was a cousin of King Lunalilo and namesake of his mother Kekāuluohi who ruled as Kuhina Nui (premier) under Kamehameha III.

A collateral relation of the House of Kamehameha, she was connected to the ruling family of the Hawaiian Kingdom from her cousin to King Lunalilo to his successors King Kalakaua and Queen Liliʻuokalani. She married firstly German-American Jesse Crowningburg and later Paul Kamai. Auhea became the kahu (caretaker or guardian) of the Lunalilo Mausoleum, her cousin's personal family tomb on the grounds of the Kawaiahaʻo Church. She witnessed the overthrow of the Hawaiian Kingdom in 1893, the establishment of the Republic of Hawaii in 1894 and finally Hawaii's annexation to the United States in 1898. Auhea died on May 16, 1899, and was buried next to her cousin on the grounds of the Lunalilo Mausoleum. Her descendants have traditionally held the position of kahu of the Royal Mausoleum at Mauna ʻAla.

Ancestry
Born in 1839, Auhea's parents were the High Chief John Harold Kaiheʻekai and High Chiefess Namahana, from the aliʻi (nobility) class. Kaiheʻekai was the son of Hoʻolulu, son of Kameʻeiamoku, one of the royal twins (with Kamanawa) who advised Kamehameha I in his conquest of the Hawaiian Islands. Hoʻolulu and his brother Hoapili were chosen to conceal the bones of King Kamehameha I in a secret hiding place after his death and her family have become the traditional kahu (guardians) of the royal burial sites. Kaiheʻekai's mother was Charlotte Halaki Cox, whose father lent his name to Keʻeaumoku II, the Governor of Maui. Through her great-grandfather Captain Harold Cox, Auhea was either one-eighth English or American descent.
Her mother Namahana was the daughter of Peleuli, daughter of High Chief Kalaʻimamahu, half-brother of Kamehameha I. Her grandmother was the half-sister of Miriam Auhea Kekāuluohi, who ruled as Kuhina Nui of the Hawaiian Kingdom under Kamehameha III from 1839 to 1845, making the younger Auhea a second cousin of King Lunalilo. It was alleged that she was betrothed to Lunalilo but eloped instead with Jesse Crowningburg. After Lunalilo's death during his short reign as King, Auhea was considered to have a claim to the throne herself. In fact, her descent from a collateral line of the House of Kamehameha made her granddaughters possible claimants to the Crown Lands of Hawaii during the Hawaiian Territorial days.

Later life and death

After the death of her cousin Lunalilo, Kalākaua was elected as the new Hawaiian monarch in 1874. The new king and Auhea shared a common ancestor in Kameʻeiamoku. However, from the start, Kalākaua and his siblings were openly challenged by Hawaiians loyal to Queen Emma, the widow of Kamehameha IV and a collateral descendant of the Kamehamehas in her own right. Wishing to quiet oppositions in the Hawaiian community to the new reigning family in regards to their genealogy, Auhea along with Ruth Keʻelikōlani openly acknowledged the House of Kalākaua.

In later life, Auhea became the kahu (caretaker or guardian) of the Lunalilo Mausoleum, her cousin's personal family tomb on the grounds of the Kawaiahaʻo Church. The aging chiefess witnessed the 1893 overthrow of the Hawaiian Kingdom with Queen Liliʻuokalani, the establishment of the Republic of Hawaii in 1894 and finally Hawaii's annexation to the United States in 1898. Auhea died in Honolulu on May 16, 1899.
In acknowledgement of her chiefly status, she was buried in the lot outside the vault of Lunalilo's Mausoleum. Her grandson William Bishop Taylor is also buried near the mausoleum. After her death, her cousin High Chiefess Maria Beckley Kahea, the kahu of Mauna ʻAla since 1893 and another scion of the Hoʻolulu line, replaced her as kahu of the Lunalilo Mausoleum. Hoʻolulu Street, near Kapahulu, Honolulu, was named by Auhea after her ancestor.

Marriage and descendants

Auhea married Jesse Crowningburg (a German-American settler in Hawaii), sometime before 1859. He served as the tax collector for Lahaina and Wailuku on Maui.
They had three children: William Charles Keʻeaumoku Crowningburg (died 1881) and Elizabeth Keomailani Crowningburg (1859–1887). Another daughter Lydia Kalola died at Lahaina on November 21, 1859, at the age of eight months and twenty-seven days. Their marriage ended in divorce. On January 20, 1873, she remarried to Paul Kamai, a maternal uncle of Helen Manaiula Lewis Isenberg and her half-sister Abigail Kuaihelani Campbell. They had a son named Albert Edward Kameeiamoku Kamai or Charles Harold Kameeiamoku-Kaiheekai, who died young.

Auhea's descendants survive today through her first two children. Her maternal grandson William Edward Bishop Kaiheʻekai Taylor (1882–1956), who Bernice Pauahi Bishop unsuccessful attempted to hānai (adopt), would later serve as a trustee for the Lunalilo Home.
Taylor would succeed the Kaheas', descendants of Auhea's aunt Kahinu-o-Kekuaokalani Beckley, as the kahu (caretaker) of the Royal Mausoleum at Mauna ʻAla in 1947, serving till his death. All subsequent kahu of Mauna ʻAla have been descendants of Auhea and her ancestor Hoʻolulu except for Taylor's widow and Hawaiian kumu hula ʻIolani Luahine.

Her most controversial descendant is her great-great-great-grandson Sammy Amalu (1917–1986), a longtime columnist at The Honolulu Advertiser. Amalu was described as a con man by Craig Gima of the Honolulu Star-Bulletin editorial staff. A self-proclaimed royal, who titled himself High Chief Kapiikauinamoku, Prince of Keawe and Duke of Konigsberg, he attempted to buy up several Waikiki hotels with phony checks in the 1940s and ended up in jail. Under the alias Kapiikauinamoku, he later wrote "The Story of Hawaiian Royalty" and "The Story of Maui Royalty," in a series of columns written for The Honolulu Advertiser, which accounts much of the genealogy of Hawaii's aliʻi families including his ancestress Auhea.

Notes

References

Bibliography

Newspapers and online sources

 
 
 
 
 

Royalty of the Hawaiian Kingdom
1839 births
1899 deaths
House of Kalaimamahu
People of Native Hawaiian descent
Hawaiian Kingdom people of English descent